Alston is an English language surname with several derivations, and a male given name.

Origins 
The name may have evolved from the Middle English given name "Alstan", the prefix, Al- itself derived from different Old English words ("noble", "elf", "old", "shrine", "temple"), and the suffix -stan ("stone") derived from pre 7th century Old English. The oldest public record of this derivation is found in 1279 in Cambridgeshire. One branch of this name may have been taken from the manor of  a Saxon Lord called Alstanus, who had his manor in Stambourne, North East Essex. It is known that he was still in possession of the manor after the Norman conquest, although as a tenant rather than owner, he held the land annexed against the King. There are a high density of families with the surname Alston and Alliston from around the Sudbury area, not far from Stambourne. In the 1224 feet of fines it is recorded that John son of Adam de Alliston sold land at Stanfeld (Stansfield) Suffolk. Stansfield is a few miles North of Stambourne. Both Stambourne and Stansfield may have taken their name from Æthelstan Half-King, Earl of East Anglia in the 930s.

Alston also evolved as a locational surname from villages named Alston (or Alstone) in Devonshire, Gloucestershire, Lancashire, Somerset, and Staffordshire. The oldest public records of the locational surname in these villages are from the period of 1221–1246. An alternate meaning is "from the old manor". The nearest locational name to Stambourne was Alston village in Suffolk near Trimley St Martin, recorded in the Domesday Book as Alteinestuna. The original meaning may have been Stone of Fire Farm (tuna).  Alteines is a Gallic word meaning "stone of fire" and is associated with sorcery. The church was consolidated to Trimley St Martin in 1362.

The coat of arms containing the stars may have been taken as a variant of the coat of arms of the De Veres (Earls of Oxford) who were one of the most powerful post Norman East Anglian families and associated with early East Anglian Alstons.

Notable people with the name include:

Surname 
Adrian Alston (born 1949), Australian soccer player
Arthur Alston (1872–1954), British Anglican priest, Bishop of Middleton
Arthur Hugh Garfit Alston (1902–1958), English botanist
Ashanti Alston (born 1954), American anarchist activist, speaker, and writer
Sir Beilby Alston (1868–1929), British diplomat
Bill Alston (1884–1971), Scottish professional football player
Blair Alston (born 1992), Scottish professional football player
C. Donald Alston, United States Air Force general
Charles Alston (botanist) (1683–1760), Scottish botanist
Charles Alston (1907–1977), African-American painter, sculptor, illustrator, muralist, and teacher
Dave Alston (1846–1893), American baseball umpire
Dean Alston (born 1950), Australian cartoonist
Dell Alston (born 1952), American former baseball player
Derrick Alston (born 1972), American basketball player
Sir Edward Alston (1595–1669), president of the British College of Physicians
Edward Richard Alston (1845–1881), Scottish zoologist
Garvin Alston (born 1971), American baseball player
Gerald Alston (born 1951), American R&B singer
"Granny" Alston (1908–1985), English cricketer 
Jan Alston (born 1969), Canadian ice hockey player
John Alston, 19th-century explorer of Australia
Jon Alston (born 1983), American football player
Joseph Alston (disambiguation)
Julian Alston, Australian-American economist
Kevin Alston (born 1988), American soccer player
Kwaku Alston, American photographer
Lee J. Alston (born 1951), American professor of economics
Lemuel J. Alston (1760–1836), United States Congressman
Lettie Alston (born 1953), African-American composer
Louise Alston, Australian director and producer
Lyneal Alston (born 1964), American football player
Mack Alston (born 1947), American football player
Margaret Alston-Garnjost (1929–2019), British physicist
Michael Alston, Australian disabled fencer
Mike Alston (born 1985), American football player
Nick Alston, British civil servant, later a Police and Crime Commissioner and health service manager
O'Brien Alston (born 1965), American football player
Ovie Alston (1905–1989), American jazz trumpeter, vocalist, and bandleader
Peter Alston (c.1765–1804), American counterfeiter and river pirate
Philip Alston (counterfeiter), 18th-century American counterfeiter, frontier military leader
Philip Alston, American law scholar and human rights practitioner
Rafer Alston (born 1976), American basketball player
Rex Alston (1901–1994), British radio sports commentator
Richard Alston (disambiguation)
Robert W. Alston (18th–19th centuries), American planter, grandfather of Robert Augustus Alston
Robert Alston (born 1938), British diplomat
Royal Alston (c.1888–unknown), American college football coach
Theodosia Burr Alston (1783–1813), daughter of U.S. Vice President Aaron Burr, disappeared at sea
Thomas Alston (disambiguation)
Tiffany Alston (born 1977), American politician
Walter Alston (1911–1984), American baseball player and manager
Wanda Alston (1959–2005), United States feminist activist and government official
William Alston (disambiguation)
Willis Alston (1769–1837), U.S. Congressman from North Carolina

Given name 
Alston Bobb (born 1984), West Indian cricketer
Alston G. Dayton (1857–1920), American politician
Alston Scott Householder (1904–1993), American mathematician
Alston Koch (born 1951), Sri Lankan singer-songwriter and record producer
Alston May (1869–1940), British Anglican priest, Bishop of Northern Rhodesia
Alston Purvis (born 1943), American graphic designer, artist, professor and author
Alston Wise (1904–1984), Canadian ice hockey player

References